The 2013–14 Israeli Hockey League season was the 23rd season of the Israeli Hockey League, the top level of ice hockey in Israel. Eight teams participated in the league, and the Rishon Devils won the championship for the 2nd time in a row.

First round

North

Center

Final round

3rd place 

Maccabi Metulla - HC Ma'alot
0 : 2

Final 

Rishon Devils - Horses Kfar Saba
9:1 (1:1, 4:0, 4:0)

References

External links 
Israeli Hockey League hawkshaifa.com

Isr
Israeli League (ice hockey) seasons
Seasons